Krasnoarmeysky District is an administrative and municipal district (raion), one of the twenty-seven in Chelyabinsk Oblast, Russia. It is located in the northeast of the oblast. Its administrative center is the rural locality (a selo) of Miasskoye. Population:  43,553 (2002 Census);  The population of Miasskoye accounts for 23.4% of the district's total population.

References

Notes

Sources

Districts of Chelyabinsk Oblast